Anthe may refer to:

Anthe (moon), natural moon of the Saturn
Anthe, alternate name of Anthela (Thessaly), an ancient town of Thessaly, Greece
Anthé, a village in the southern France
Anthe Philippides, an Australian judge of the Supreme Court of Queensland
Anthe (mythology), one of the daughters of the giant Alcyoneus
Georges-Charles de Heeckeren d'Anthès, a baron of the Second French Empire